Soorappa is a 2000 Indian Kannada-language action drama film directed by Naganna and produced by Super Hit Films. The film stars Vishnuvardhan in his 175th film along with Charan Raj, Shruti and Anu Prabhakar in prominent roles. The film had a musical score and soundtrack composed and written by Hamsalekha.

The film is a remake of the Tamil film Maru Malarchi (1998), directed by Bharathi, which starred Mammootty and Devayani.

The film released to generally positive reviews from critics and was one of the biggest hits of the year 2000. Producer M. B. Babu was renamed Soorappa Babu after the success of this film.

Cast 
 Vishnuvardhan as Soorappa aka Rayaru
 Shruti as Lakshmi
 Charan Raj as Balarama 
 Ramesh Bhat as Babu
 Sathyapriya as Soorappa’s Mother
 Anu Prabhakar
 Chi Guru Dutt
 Bank Janardhan
 M. N. Lakshmi Devi
 Tennis Krishna
 Mandeep Roy
 Krishne Gowda

Soundtrack 
The music of the film was composed and written by Hamsalekha.

References

External links 
Preview at Online Bangalore

2000 films
2000s Kannada-language films
Indian action films
Kannada remakes of Tamil films
Films scored by Hamsalekha
Films directed by Naganna
2000 action films